Mars Lights are signal-safety lights used in the United States and built by Mars Signal Light Company for railroad locomotives and firefighting apparatus. Mars Lights used a variety of means to cause the light to oscillate vertically, horizontally, or both, to catch the attention of motorists and pedestrians.

Mars lights were developed by Jerry Kennelly, a Chicago firefighter who realized that oscillating lamps would benefit fire departments and railroads. He performed an operational test with the Chicago and North Western railroad in 1936, and Mars Lights began appearing on locomotives in the later 1930s.

Tri Lite, Inc. announced their acquisition of the Mars Signal Light Company, on January 23, 1991. Tri Lite still manufactures many of the traditional Mars Lights under the Tri Lite Mars brand. The company has since updated the Mars "888" Traffic Breaker with energy-efficient LEDs replacing the earlier sealed beam halogen/incandescent lamp.

Design variations
There were many models of Mars Lights, which used several methods to oscillate the beam. Sometimes the entire lamp and assembly were moved; on other models, the reflector behind the bulb was rotated. The beam was usually oscillated in a triple eight pattern, i.e., the beam would oscillate up and down two or more times for every horizontal sweep, providing a source for the company slogan, "The Light from Mars". The beams came in a variety of shapes and colors, some locomotives having red and white lights.

Railroad use

Many railroads used Mars lights on a variety of locomotives, both steam and diesel.  Mars Lights are no longer used by railways, having been replaced by ditch lights, with the exception of some passenger carriers, such as Chicago's Metra, which uses both Mars Lights and ditch lights on their equipment. Older locomotives originally equipped with Mars Lights may still use them if fitted and still functioning. They are still used on fire fighting apparatus, and are available from Tri Lite / Mars, located in Chicago, Illinois.

LACoFD requirement
The Los Angeles County Fire Department required Mars lights as a standard LACoFD warning device until the Federal Sign & Signal BeaconRay was adopted as a replacement.

Gyralite
Gyralite is a similar type of gyrating warning light formerly made by The Pyle-National Company and now by Trans-Lite, Inc.  It is distinguishable from the Mars Light in that the ratio of vertical oscillations to horizontal oscillations is unitary, producing a circular or elliptical scan effect.

See also
 Grade crossing signals

References

External links
 Gyrating Warning Lights
 www.triliteinc.com/ — Tri Lite site

Railway signaling in the United States